Heliocheilus aleurota is a moth in the family Noctuidae. It is found in New South Wales, the Northern Territory, Queensland, South Australia, Victoria and Western Australia.

References

External links 
 Australian Caterpillars
 Australian Faunal Directory

Heliocheilus
Moths of Australia
Moths described in 1902